Thomas "Tom" J. Rielly (born 1966) is a former Iowa State Senator from the 38th district. A Democrat, he was elected to the Iowa Senate defeating Republican incumbent Neal Schuerer in 2004 with 14,670 votes (52%). In 2013 he retired and challenger Republican Tim Kapucian won the open seat against Shelley Parbs.

Rielly had served on several committees in the Iowa Senate - the Commerce committee; the Economic Growth committee; the Local Government committee; the Agriculture committee, where he is vice chair; and the Transportation committee, where he is chair.

References

External links
Senator Tom Rielly official Iowa Legislature site
Senator Tom Rielly official Iowa General Assembly site
State Senator Tom Rielly official constituency site
 

Democratic Party Iowa state senators
Living people
Place of birth missing (living people)
1966 births